Vyacheslav Anatolyevich Shtyrov (born 23 May 1953) is a Russian businessman who ran the diamond mining giant Almazy Rossii — Sakha (Alrosa) from 1996 to 2002. In 2004 it was reported that he owns 0.14% of Alrosa.

Born on 23 May 1953 in Khandyga village, Tomponsky District, Yakut Autonomous Republic. Ethnically Russian. His father was counter admiral Anatoly Tikhonovich Shtyrov (1929–2014), First Deputy Chief of Intelligence of the Pacific Fleet, Deputy Chief of the Naval Directorate of the South-West Command. In 1975 Vyacheslav graduated from the Far Eastern State Technical University. After graduating, he was sent to work in the Construction Department "Gokstroy" of VilyuyGESstroy of the USSR Ministry of Energy. He spent 11 years at Gokstroy, moving to the post of deputy director.

From 1986 to 1988 he was Deputy Head of the Construction Department of the Yakutia Regional Committee of the CPSU. In 1991 he was appointed Minister of Construction and Investments of Yakutia.

From 1991 to 1997 Shtyrov served as Vice President of the Republic of Sakha (Yakutia) under Mikhail Nikolayev. From 1992 to December 1994, he combined the posts of Vice President and Chairman of the Government of Sakha. In 1995 he became the director of Diamonds of Russia — Sakha JSC, which was renamed into Alrosa a year later. In 2002 Shtyrov was elected second president of Sakha and left Alrosa.

He took office on 27 January 2002 after being elected in an election which took two rounds. He received 52.25% of the vote in the runoff. He left office on 31 May 2010 for personal reasons. Later he became a Deputy Chairman of the Federation Council at the Federal Assembly of the Russian Federation.

Family
Shtyrov is married to Liliya Ivanovna Shtyrova,
They have two daughters. Yuliya and Tatiana.

Wealth 
In 2004, his wealth was estimated to be $410 million (12.5 Billion Rubles).

References

External links
Official website of the government of the Republic of Sakha (Yakutia)

1953 births
Living people
Heads of the Sakha Republic
Vice Presidents of the Sakha Republic
United Russia politicians
21st-century Russian politicians
Members of the Federation Council of Russia (after 2000)